Cheshmeh Barad (also known as Nūrābād) is a village in Koregah-e Gharbi Rural District, in the Central District of Khorramabad County, Lorestan Province, Iran. At the 2006 census, its population was 19, in 4 families.

References 

Towns and villages in Khorramabad County